Ewa Wojtaszek (born February 28, 1959) is a Polish sprint canoer who competed in the early 1980s. At the 1980 Summer Olympics in Moscow, she finished seventh in the K-2 500 m event. Born in Tomaszów Mazowiecki.

References
Sports-Reference.com profile

1959 births
Canoeists at the 1980 Summer Olympics
Living people
Olympic canoeists of Poland
Polish female canoeists
People from Tomaszów Mazowiecki
Sportspeople from Łódź Voivodeship